An antiglucocorticoid is a drug which reduces glucocorticoid activity in the body. They include direct glucocorticoid receptor antagonists such as mifepristone and synthesis inhibitors such as metyrapone, ketoconazole, and aminoglutethimide. They are used to treat Cushing's syndrome.

Antiglucocorticoids could be effective antidepressants for a subset of specific mood disorders, but their use is limited by side effects.

See also
 Corticosteroid
 Antimineralocorticoid

References

Antiglucocorticoids